Matteo Moscardi is an Italian rugby union player.
His usual position is as a centre and he currently plays for Rugby Rovigo Delta in Italian Top10. 

Moscardi signed for Zebre Parma in July 2022 ahead of the 2022–23 United Rugby Championship.
He played for Zebre until January 2023.

In 2018 and 2019 he was named in Italy U20s squad for annual Six Nations Under 20s Championship. On 26 May 2022, for the match against Netherlands, he was named in the 30-man Emerging Italy squad,  for the 2022 July rugby union tests. On 10 January 2023, he was named in Italy A squad for a uncapped test against Romania A.

References

External links
It's Rugby England Profile
All Rugby Profile

2000 births
People from Rovigo
Living people
Italian rugby union players
Rugby union centres
Rugby Rovigo Delta players
Zebre Parma players